Jayson Castro William (born June 30, 1986) is a Filipino professional basketball player for the TNT Tropang Giga of the Philippine Basketball Association (PBA). His moniker is "The Blur" for his speed.

He played for the Philippine Christian University Dolphins in the National Collegiate Athletic Association, Philippine Basketball League teams Hapee-PCU Teeth Protectors and Harbour Centre Batang Pier.

Amateur career

High school career 
Originally from neighboring Betis, Guagua, Castro was a part of the high school basketball team of Don Honorio Ventura State University in Bacolor. Castro was the only player from his batch to play college basketball, with Philippine Christian University (PCU) in Manila.

College career
Castro first played for the PCU Dolphins in the NCAA at the 2003 season as a 5'10" point guard. The Dolphins were not able to clinch a Final Four berth, finishing with a 5-9 record.

Things changed on the 2004 season in which PCU was able to make a turnaround with Castro, Gabby Espinas and Robert Sanz at the helm, denying Letran a back-to-back championship run. Holding the twice to beat advantage, the Dolphins needed an extra game that went into overtime to enter the finals. In the championship series against the University of Perpetual Help, the Dolphins swept the best-of-3 finals series to win their first NCAA championship. Castro played second fiddle to both Espinas who won the League MVP award and Sanz, who won the Finals MVP award.

In the 2005 season, the Dolphins went into another Final Four appearance, and they made short work of Mapúa on their way to the Finals where they met Letran once again. The Dolphins won Game 1 behind Castro's game-high 20 points. The Dolphins were beaten by Letran in the next two games as Castro got cold.

In 2006 season, Castro gave out an all-NCAA team performance as he was named as one of the Mythical 5 members; he and Espinas led PCU to a third consecutive Finals appearance this time against San Beda College. Despite Castro scoring a team-high 16 points, the Dolphins were blown out by the Red Lions on Game 1. Castro's teammates stepped up on Game 2 to force a deciding game. In the third game, with PCU trailing by a point in the dying seconds, Castro passed off the game-winning shot to Beau Belga who missed his jumper to lose the championship for PCU. The Dolphins would be suspended the following year after irregularities on their high school team, thus ending Castro's collegiate career.

Philippine Basketball League

Addict Mobile
After a deserving NCAA 2004 Champions and part of the Mythical 5. The Fil-Am Jayson Castro William was headed to the AMP Mobile Phone team, which he was a backup to LA Tenorio. His PCU teammates Gabby Espinas and Rob Sanz, gave their worth talents to remain in the Philippine Basketball League. They were joined by Ateneo Blue Eagles team, composed of Paolo Bugia, LA Tenorio, Magnum Membrere, and company.

Harbour Centre Port Masters
In this time of Jayson Castro's life, he rose to the occasion. Even if he was still a backup to LA Tenorio, he played consistently. He was with Mac Cardona and his former PCU teammates Gabby Espinas, Rob Sanz, Beau Belga, and Joel Solis. Castro was slowly becoming a premiere amateur point guard during this time.

Hapee PCU Teeth Masters
He then transferred to Hapee PCU. He remained with the team for a season with Gabby Espinas, Rob Sanz, Joel Solis, Mark Moreño and others. Unfortunately, the team was on a slump making them cellar dwellers on the standings. Hapee PCU had a disastrous season.

Hapee-PCU Teeth Sparklers
After PCU's championship, Lamoiyan Corporation sponsored the core of that team to participate in the PBL as the Hapee-PCU Teeth Sparklers. The Sparklers entered the Finals against the Harbour Centre Batang Pier and were defeated. Hapee made several more playoff runs but were beaten either by Harbour Centre or by Toyota-Otis (ironically mostly composed of Letran players).

In the midst of Jayson Castro's third season at Hapee, he was acquired by Junel Baculi, his coach in PCU, to join the RP team with Marvin Cruz, JC Intal, Ryan Araña, Chad Alonzo, and Beau Belga, with 2 imports. They claimed the SEABA 2006 club championship crown.

In the middle of the 2nd season and 3rd season, he was again acquired. He was with Gabe Norwood, Beau Belga, Chad Alonzo, Eugene Tan, Patrick Cabahug, and Jeff Chan. They reached the finals but were unlucky as they lost the SEABA 2007 club championship crown. Castro was an MVP contender during this time.

Return to Harbour Centre
When PCU was suspended, Castro transferred to Harbour Centre and won 2 championships with them. After 2 conferences of sterling performances, Castro was named as the PBL 2007 Most Valuable Player. In the next season, Castro and the Batang Pier met Hapee, this time led by Filipino-American Gabe Norwood in both of the season's finals and beat them. Castro was adjudged as the MVP anew, beating Norwood. Proving himself to be a deserving grandslam MVP, he edged Reed Juntilla, Ken Bono, and Norwood in the race.

Professional career

Singapore Slingers
Castro signed with the Singapore Slingers during a televised ceremony in May 2008, and was supposed to be the first Filipino player in the National Basketball League, Australia's top-level professional basketball competition. However, about a month before the start of the season, the Slingers withdrew permanently from the NBL citing excessive transport costs to Australia.

Talk 'N Text Tropang Texters / TNT Tropang Texters / Tropang TNT / TNT Katropa
During his championship career with the Singapore Slingers, he decided to leave the team and joined the PBA. He sent an application to the Philippine Basketball Association enabling him to be included in the draft class of the 2008 PBA Draft at Market! Market! in Bonifacio Global City, Taguig. Castro was selected as the third overall pick of the Talk 'N Text Tropang Texters courtesy of a trade that sent superstar Jay Washington to the San Miguel Beermen in exchange for the third pick that turned out to be Castro.

Recently he was awarded by the PSA to be part of the Nation's brightest stars together with Manny Pacquiao, Manny Pangilinan, Manny Villar, Kelly Williams, Nonito Donaire, Wesley So and Willy Wang. He was also awarded by the PBA to be the Mr. Quality Minutes Player of the year beating Joseph Yeo. He averaged 9.1 points, 3.5 rebounds, 3.9 assists and 1.4 steals in the 2008-09 PBA season.

The season's No. 3 draft pick was No. 7 in assists (3.9), No. 9 in assist-to-turnover ratio (1.8)

Talk N' Text won the championship against the San Miguel Beermen (4-2). He and Jimmy Alapag were titled as co-Finals MVP's.

Talk N' Text won back to back championships in the 2010-2011 Commissioner's Cup against another San Miguel Corporation franchise the Barangay Ginebra Kings. Castro was named the Finals MVP and co-siding again with Jimmy Alapag for two consecutive conferences.

In 2015, Castro captured his sixth title with the Talk 'N Text franchise and PBA career after winning the 2015 PBA Commissioner's Cup title against Rain or Shine Elasto Painters.

On October 14, 2016 Castro was recognized during the PBA Leo Awards Night as he was named to the PBA Mythcial First Team.

National team career

Youth team
Castro was in the roster of the Philippine basketball youth team in 2004.

2007 Southeast Asian Games
Castro was a part of the Philippine national team in the 2007 Southeast Asian Games basketball tournament. The Philippines won the gold medal without losing a game.

2013 FIBA Asia Championship
Jayson Castro was part of the Philippine team who won the silver medal in the 2013 FIBA Asia Championship. He was part of the FIBA Asia Mythical Team.

Castro averaged better than 11 points in nine games for Gilas Pilipinas. He was brilliant in the last two games, scoring 17 points in the semifinal victory over South Korea and 18 in the gold medal game against Iran.

2015 FIBA Asia Championship
Jayson Castro once again proved to be the Asia's best point guard after he was named to the Mythical Five for the second straight FIBA Asia Championship.

He has been the Gilas Pilipinas main gunner in the tournament, with his partnership with naturalized player Andray Blatche proving to be a formidable duo on the offensive end.

The Philippines finished 2nd in the 2015 FIBA Asia Championship.

2016 Men's Olympic Basketball Qualifier–Manila
Castro was among the players who made it into the Final 12 roster of Gilas Pilipinas for the Men's Olympic Basketball Qualifying Tournament held in Manila.

After the team bowed out of the competition, Castro announced on his Instagram photo that he will retire from his international career, citing the game against New Zealand will be the final game of his stint with the national basketball team.

Career statistics

PBA

As of the end of 2021 season

Season-by-season averages

|-
| align=left | 
| align=left | Talk 'N Text
| 46 || 24.0 || .439 || .330 || .860 || 3.4 || 4.0 || 1.1 || .3 || 10.0
|-
| align=left | 
| align=left | Talk 'N Text
| 48 || 25.3 || .447 || .329 || .640 || 3.7 || 3.7 || .8 || .3 || 10.0
|-
| align=left | 
| align=left | Talk 'N Text
| 61 || 25.1 || .382 || .304 || .757 || 3.9 || 4.1 || 1.0 || .2 || 11.9
|-
| align=left | 
| align=left | Talk 'N Text
| 56 || 28.9 || .415 || .363 || .710 || 3.9 || 3.9 || .9 || .1 || 14.7
|-
| align=left | 
| align=left | Talk 'N Text
| 53 || 27.8 || .403 || .321 || .731 || 4.4 || 3.7 || .8 || .1 || 14.5
|-
| align=left | 
| align=left | Talk 'N Text
| 49 || 29.4 || .404 || .369 || .788 || 4.0 || 4.2 || .9 || .2 || 16.8
|-
| align=left | 
| align=left | Talk 'N Text
| 48 || 32.7 || .446 || .420 || .729 || 4.1 || 5.4 || 1.2 || .2 || 18.5
|-
| align=left | 
| align=left | TNT
| 41 || 31.6 || .421 || .342 || .753 || 4.0 || 6.1 || 1.1 || .4 || 20.3
|-
| align=left | 
| align=left | TNT
| 54 || 29.9 || .440 || .316 || .802 || 4.1 || 6.2 || 1.2 || .4 || 16.8
|-
| align=left | 
| align=left | TNT
| 33 || 28.3 || .388 || .342 || .844 || 4.5 || 5.6 || 1.4 || .5 || 14.8
|-
| align=left | 
| align=left | TNT
| 51 || 34.7 || .394 || .317 || .828 || 4.6 || 6.1 || 1.7 || .5 || 15.2
|-
| align=left | 
| align=left | TNT
| 19 || 28.1 || .438 || .278 || .745 || 3.5 || 5.1 || 1.5 || .2 || 15.2
|-
| align=left | 
| align=left | TNT
| 37 || 24.0 || .419 || .286 || .861 || 3.1 || 3.7 || 1.1 || .3 || 11.0
|-class=sortbottom
| align=center colspan=2 | Career
| 596 || 28.5 || .416 || .341 || .768 || 4.0 || 4.7 || 1.1 || .3 || 14.5

National team

|-
| align=left | 2013 FIBA Asia Championship
| align=left rowspan="4" | 
| 9 || 20.8 || .641 || .466 || .941 || 3.3 || 3.0 || 0.7 || 0.2 || 11.8
|-
| align=left | 2014 FIBA Basketball World Cup
| 4 || 17.2 || .421 || .457 || .833 || 1.2 || 1.2 || 0.5 || 0.0 || 6.5
|-
| align=left | 2015 William Jones Cup
| 6 || 24.0 || .543 || .344 || .692 || 3.2 || 4.2 || 2.2 || 0.0 || 13.3
|-
| align=left | 2015 FIBA Asia Championship
| 9 || 24.4 || .519 || .467 || .850 || 3.2 || 2.6 || 1.0 || 0.0 || 16.7

Honors and achievements
2004-2006 NCAA Mythical 5 Selection
 2006-07 PBL Mythical 5 Selection
 2006-07 PBL Most Valuable Player
 2006-2007 PBL Showcase Skills Challenge Champion
 2007-08 PBL Mythical 5 Selection
 2007-2008 PBL Unity Cup Most Valuable Player
 2007-08 PBL Silver Cup Most Valuable Player
 2008 Brunei Cup Most Valuable Player
 2008 Malaysia Basketball League Most Valuable Player playing for the Singapore Slingers
 2009 Sports Digest PSA Fetes Nation's Brightest Stars Awardee
 2009 PBA Mr. Quality Player of the Year
 2010-2011 Philippine Cup Finals MVP
 2010-2011 Commissioner's Cup Finals MVP
 2010-2011 Mythical Second Team Selection
 2010-2011 PBA Most Improved Player
 2012-2013 Philippine Cup - Best Player of the Conference
 2012-2013 PBA First Mythical Team
 2014 Commissioner's Cup Best Player of the Conference
 2015 Commissioner's Cup Best Player of the Conference
 2013 FIBA Asia Championship Mythical All-Star Selection - Best Point Guard in Asia
 2015 William Jones Cup Mythical Five
 2015 FIBA Asia Championship Mythical All-Star Selection

References

1986 births
Living people
Basketball players from Pampanga
Kapampangan people
Filipino people of African-American descent
PCU Dolphins basketball players
Philippine Basketball Association All-Stars
Philippines men's national basketball team players
Filipino men's basketball players
Point guards
Shooting guards
Southeast Asian Games gold medalists for the Philippines
Southeast Asian Games competitors for the Philippines
Southeast Asian Games medalists in basketball
TNT Tropang Giga players
2014 FIBA Basketball World Cup players
Competitors at the 2007 Southeast Asian Games
TNT Tropang Giga draft picks
People from Guagua